Levante Football Club was a football club in Valencia, Spain. It was a predecessor of current Levante UD.

History
The club was founded in 1909 as "Levante Football Club". In 1939 Levante FC and Gimnástico FC merged into "Levante Unión Deportiva". Levante UD thus having origin since, at least, 1909 from both merged teams, Levante FC and Gimnástico FC. Today, Levante UD is the most senior football club in Valencia. Local rival team Valencia CF was not formed until 1919.

Background
Levante FC - (1909–1939) → ↓
Levante FC - Gimnástico FC, renamed Levante Unión Deportiva- (1939–Present)
Gimnástico FC - (1909–1939) → ↑

Copa de la España Libre 

During the Spanish Civil War both Levante FC and Gimnástico CF played in the Mediterranean League, finishing fifth and sixth respectively. Teams from this league also competed in the Copa de la España Libre (Free Spain Cup). It was originally intended that the top four teams from the league would enter the cup, but FC Barcelona opted to tour Mexico and the United States. As a result, Levante FC took their place. The first round of the competition was a mini-league with the top two teams, Levante FC and Valencia CF, then qualifying for the final. On 18 July 1937, Levante FC beat their city rivals 1–0 at the Montjuïc.

Season to season

 2 seasons in Segunda División
 5 seasons in Tercera División

Honours
Copa del Rey (Spanish Cup)
Quarter-finals (1): 1935

Kit evolution

References

External links 
  
 Regional Titles at RSSSF
 Copa de España Libre, at RSSSF

 
Association football clubs established in 1909
Association football clubs disestablished in 1939
Defunct football clubs in the Valencian Community
1909 establishments in Spain
1939 disestablishments in Spain
Segunda División clubs